Kelly Wood (born 1962) is a Canadian visual artist and photographer from Toronto, Ontario. Wood’s artistic practice is primarily based in Vancouver, B.C. and London, Ontario.

Education 
Wood obtained a diploma from Emily Carr University of Art and Design in 1988 and an M.F.A. from the University of British Columbia in 1996. While studying at the University of British Columbia, Wood was advised by Vancouver School artists Jeff Wall and Ian Wallace.

Career 
Wood’s practice primarily focuses on photography from a feminist perspective and has been regarded for her vibrant "photographic maneuvers." In 1996, Wood had her first solo commercial exhibition at Catriona Jeffries Gallery.

Wood has been recognized for her exhibition the Continuous Garbage Project: 1998–2003, exhibited at the Morris and Helen Belkin Art Gallery and Catriona Jeffries Gallery. The project included photographs of transparent garbage bags taken over the course of five years. Through the exhibition, Wood explored labour, craft, and photography, with photographs "reminiscent of Man Ray’s photographs of the ‘dust breeding.’" Wood has written articles for Border Crossings, including a review of Stan Douglas’ work entitled "Still Supplementation: Stan Douglas’s Cuba Photographs." Wood is currently a professor at Western University in London, Ontario.

Artistic collaborations 
In 2008, Wood collaborated with Polish artist Monika Grzymala on a site specific installation at Catriona Jefferies Gallery. The exhibition combined Gryzmala’s digital background with Wood’s photography to create an installation titled Binary Sound System. In 2013, Wood worked with Canadian artist Kelly Jazvac at Diaz Contemporary Gallery in Toronto on an exhibition titled, "Impel with Puffs." The exhibition combined Wood’s photographic work with Jazvac’s "salvaged vinyl [sculptures]." Wood has also exhibited with artists Myfanwy Macleod, Ron Terada, and Yoko Takashima.

Selected exhibitions 
 2010 – Vancouver Art Gallery, Everything Everyday, Vancouver, BC
 2008 – Catriona Jeffries Gallery, Kelly Wood / Monika Grzymala (curated by Jessie Caryl), Vancouver, British Columbia
 2003 – Morris and Helen Art Belkin Gallery, The Continuous Garbage Project: 1998 – 2003, Vancouver, British Columbia
 1999 – Art Gallery of Ontario, Waste Management, (curated by Christina Ritchie), Toronto, Ontario
 1991 – Front Gallery, LURCH, Vancouver, British Columbia

Public collections 
 Museum London, London, ON 
 McIntosh Gallery, Western University, London, ON 
 Vancouver Art Gallery, Vancouver, BC
 Art Gallery of Ontario, Toronto, ON 
 Canadian Museum of Contemporary Photography, Ottawa, ON
 Museum of Contemporary Canadian Art, Toronto, ON
 The Canada Council Art Bank, Ottawa, ON

Awards 
In 2003 Wood won the annual Shadbolt Foundation VIVA Award, alongside artist Geoffrey Farmer.

References 

1962 births
Living people
20th-century Canadian women artists
21st-century Canadian women artists
University of British Columbia alumni
Emily Carr University of Art and Design alumni